Launch Complex 10 (LC-10) at Cape Canaveral Space Force Station, Florida was a launch pad used by SM-64 Navaho missiles, and later Jason sounding rockets and the Alpha Draco research missile. It was located north of Launch Complex 17, where Launch Complexes 31 and 32 are now located.

A single Navaho missile was test-launched from LC-10, on 12 August 1957, and was one of only three Navahos to complete a successful flight. Following the cancellation of the Navaho, LC-10 was reused for launches of Jason and Draco sounding rockets during 1958 and 1959. The last launch to use the site was of a Draco on 27 April 1959.

LC-10 was subsequently demolished during the construction of Launch Complexes 31 and 32, which were built on the same site.

Notes

References
Encyclopedia Astronautia - Navaho

Cape Canaveral Space Force Station